The Masaka–Mutukula–Mwanza High Voltage Power Line is a proposed high voltage electricity power line, connecting the high voltage substation at Masaka, in Masaka District, in the Central Region of  Uganda, to another high voltage substation at Mwanza, in Mwanza Region, in the Republic of Tanzania.

Location
The power line starts at the Uganda Electricity Transmission Company Limited (UETCL) 220kV substation in Masaka. The line travels in a general southwesterly direction to Mutukula, at the international border with Tanzania. From Mutukula, the power line continues in a general southeasterly direction to Bukoba, on the western shores of Lake Victoria. From Bukoba, the line loops around the lake, and continues eastwards to end at Mwanza. The Ugandan portion of the power line measures .

Overview
This power line is intended to enable Uganda and Tanzania  to share electric energy. As part of the energy-sharing protocols of the East African Community, and Nile Basin Initiative, Uganda plans to increase energy sales to Tanzania, when Karuma Hydroelectric Power Station comes online in 2019. The construction of this high voltage power line has been planned as far back as 2011.

Construction
As of January 2018, the feasibility study, environmental impact assessment and population resettlement plans were complete. Plans to construct the power line were underway, under the auspices of the East African Community. In February 2019, Uganda's junior energy minister, Simon D'Ujanga announced that funds had been secured to upgrade this power line to 400kV.

In May 2022 during meetings held in Entebbe, Uganda between Presidents Yoweri Museveni of Uganda and his guest, Samia Suluhu of Tanzania, an MOU was signed for the two countries to source funds and build this power line at 400kV. In the EastAfrican newspaper the power line is referred to as the Masaka–Mutukula–Kyaka–Nyakanazi–Mwanza High Voltage Power Line.

See also
 Bujagali–Tororo–Lessos High Voltage Power Line
 Nkenda–Fort Portal–Hoima High Voltage Power Line
 Nkenda–Mpondwe–Beni High Voltage Power Line

References

External links
Website of the Uganda Electricity Transmission Company Limited
Tanzania-Kenya joint power project kicks into high gear As of 9 February 2019.

High-voltage transmission lines in Uganda
High-voltage transmission lines in Tanzania
Proposed electric power transmission systems
Proposed electric power infrastructure in Uganda
Proposed electric power infrastructure in Tanzania